Teslić is a town and municipality located in Republika Srpska, an entity of Bosnia and Herzegovina. It is situated in the central part of the Republika Srpska, on the banks of Usora River. As of 2013, the town has a population of 7,518 inhabitants, while the municipality has 38,536 inhabitants.

About  to the south-east from the city center there is a location of medieval tombstones of Duke Momčilo. Also, Solila is located on the Borja Mountain.

History

The town was settled in the 19th century with the first industrialization of Bosnia and Herzegovina. Main industries are wood products and the chemical industry. Long before Teslić began to rise a nearby village called Čečava existed as one of the oldest places people inhabited, there is archaeological evidence that Čečava existed as early as the 10th century.

From 1929 to 1941, Teslić was part of the Vrbas Banovina of the Kingdom of Yugoslavia.

Teslić was until the late 1950s among the largest industrial centers in Bosnia and Herzegovina. Today Teslić industry is mostly based on the production of wood, milk, clothing, telecommunications, electro industry, metallic industry and building construction.

Teslić is also known as a tourist destination, mainly because of the Banja Vrućica, а health spa for healing cardio-vascular diseases. With a complex of five hotels and a capacity of over 1000 beds, Banja Vrućica has the biggest tourist capacity in Bosnia and Herzegovina. The nearby mountain Borja is an attractive tourist destination with two hotels and sports facilities.

Demographics
According to the 2013 census results, the municipality of Teslić has a population of 38,536 inhabitants.

Population

Ethnic composition

Economy

The following table gives a preview of total number of registered people employed in legal entities per their core activity (as of 2018):

Notable people

 Borki Predojević, professional chess player
 Dragan Blatnjak, footballer
 Vladimir Petrović, footballer
 Željka Cvijanović, President of Republika Srpska
 Dragan Bogdanic, Minister of Health and Social Welfare of Republika Srpska

See also 
 Jezera, formerly a village in Teslić
 Kusići, formerly a sub-village of Jezera
 Vrela, a village in Teslić
 Žarkovina, a village in Teslić
 Usora River
 Krstova Gora hill (formerly Gračun)

References

External links

 

 
Populated places in Teslić
Spa towns in Bosnia and Herzegovina